New Mexico State Road 556 (NM 556) is a  state highway entirely within Bernalillo County, New Mexico. For most of its length, NM 556 is signed as Tramway Boulevard in Albuquerque, although from I-25 to its northern terminus at NM 47, NM 556 is signed as Roy Road. The highway's southern terminus is at an intersection with NM 333 and Historic U.S. Route 66 (Historic US 66), or Central Avenue. The highway then moves north intersecting with Interstate 40 (I-40). The highway is a divided four-lane road until its intersection with Tramway Road. After that, the highway narrows to two lanes and takes a westerly turn to intersect with I-25. The highway's northern terminus is at an intersection with NM 47.

Route description

State Road 556 begins at Tramway Boulevard's intersection with Central Avenue, which carries NM 333 and is also the historic route of US 66. NM 556 proceeds north from this intersection, passing through a half-diamond interchange with Interstate 40. The route travels north through the northeastern areas of Albuquerque, along the base of the Sandia Mountains. This portion of the route is a four-lane divided expressway with a speed limit of 55 mph. It eventually intersects Paseo del Norte (NM 423), a major east-west arterial through northern Albuquerque, before coming to a stop sign at Tramway Road, which provides access to the Sandia Peak Tramway. Here, NM 556 becomes a two-lane undivided road and turns to the west as Tramway Road. After crossing Interstate 25, the name of the route changes to Roy Road. Shortly thereafter, NM 556 comes to an end at its junction with NM 47.

Major intersections

See also

References

External links

556
Transportation in Bernalillo County, New Mexico